Frank Eastman Tate (born July 18, 1943) is an American jazz double-bassist. He plays a five-string double-bass.

Tate was born in Washington, DC but raised in Arlington, Virginia, where he learned to play trumpet in his youth. He picked up bass when he was 23 years old, and from 1972 to 1975 was the house bassist at the Blues Alley club. He relocated to New York City in 1975, and in the later 1970s played with Bobby Hackett, Dave McKenna, Red Balaban, and Marian McPartland. He joined Zoot Sims's band in 1980 and worked with him until 1983. He led a band in Ireland at the Queen's University Festival in 1983 that featured Al Cohn, John Bunch, Billy Hart, and Spanky Davis; he played the festival again in 1985 with Scott Hamilton, Dave McKenna, and Davis once again. Later in the 1980s he played with Pearl Bailey, Ruby Braff, and the Alden-Barrett Quintet.

References
"Frank Tate". The New Grove Dictionary of Jazz. 2nd edition, ed. Barry Kernfeld, 2004.

Further reading
Interview, The Note, vol. 3 (1), 1991, p. 2.
"Frank Tate". Jazz Journal International vol. 45 (2), 1992, p. 18, and vol. 45 (3), p. 10.

American jazz double-bassists
Male double-bassists
1943 births
Living people
Jazz musicians from Virginia
21st-century double-bassists
21st-century American male musicians
American male jazz musicians